As a given name, Cory is used by both males and females. It is a variation of the name Cora, which has Greek origins and is the maiden name of the goddess Persephone. The name also can have origins from the Gaelic word coire, which means "in a cauldron", or "in a hollow".

As a surname, it has a number of possible derivations, including an Old Norse personal name Kori of uncertain meaning, which is found in Scandinavia and England. As an Irish surname it comes from Ó Comhraidhe (descendant of Comhraidheh). Notable people or fictional characters named Cory include:

Cory Aldridge (born 1979), American baseball player
Cory Alexander (born 1973), American basketball player
Cory Arcangel (born 1978), American digital artist
Cory Asbury (born 1985), American Christian musician and worship pastor
Cory Bent (born 1997), English footballer
Cory Booker (born 1969), United States senator from New Jersey
Cory Bowles (born 1973), Canadian actor and choreographer
Cory Carr (born 1975), American-Israeli basketball player
Cory Conacher (born 1989), Canadian ice hockey player
Cory Cory-Wright (1838–1909), British businessman
Cory Cotton (born 1987), writer and member of the American sports conglomerate Dude Perfect
Cory Cyrenne (born 1977), Canadian ice hockey player
Cory Doctorow (born 1971), Canadian journalist and author
Cory Edwards, American writer and director
Cory Everson (born 1958), American bodybuilder and actress
Cory Fong (born 1972), American public servant
Cory Gearrin (born 1986), American baseball player
Cory Gibbs (born 1980), American association footballer
Cory Hardrict (born 1979), American actor
Cory Jane (born 1983), New Zealand rugby union footballer
Cory Kennedy (model) (born 1990), American model
Cory Kennedy (skateboarder), American professional skateboarder
Cory La Quay, American drummer of the post-hardcore band A Skylit Drive
Cory Lee (born 1984), Canadian singer-songwriter and actress
Cory Lerios (born 1951), American pianist and vocalist
Cory Lidle (1972–2006), American baseball player
Cory Marks, Canadian country rock singer
Cory McGrath (born 1979), Australian rules footballer
Cory Monteith (1982–2013), Canadian actor
Cory Morgan (ice hockey) (born 1978), Canadian ice hockey player
Cory Morrow (born 1972), American singer-songwriter
Cory Nelms (born 1988), American football player
Cory Paterson (born 1987), Australian rugby league footballer
Cory Pecker (born 1981), Canadian ice hockey player
Cory Philpot (born 1970), Canadian Football League player
Cory Quirino (born 1953), Filipino TV host
Cory Redding (born 1980), American National Football League player
Cory Rooney, American songwriter and record producer
Cory Sarich (born 1978), Canadian ice hockey player
Cory Schlesinger (born 1972), American footballer
Cory Spangenberg (born 1991), American baseball player
Cory Spinks (born 1978), American boxer
Cory Stillman (born 1973), Canadian ice hockey player
Cory Sullivan (born 1979), American baseball player
Cory Wade (born 1983), American baseball player
Cory Walker (born 1980), American comic book artist
Cory Wells (1941–2015), American singer
Cory T. Williams, American attorney and Democratic politician
Cory Williams (born 1981), American YouTube personality also known as "Mr. Safety"
Cory Witherill (born 1971), American race car driver

Surname 
 Annie Sophie Cory (1868–1952), English author
 Asa Howe Cory (1814–1892), American Civil War captain
 Arthur Cory, American politician
 Charles B. Cory (1857–1921), American ornithologist and golfer
 Clifford Cory (1859–1941), Welsh coal owner and Liberal Party politician
 Donald Webster Cory, pen name of Edward Sagarin (1913–1986)
 Eleanor Cory (born 1943), American composer
 Fanny Cory, American illustrator of the Little Miss Muffet comic book
 Florence Elizabeth Cory (1851–1902), American industrial designer and school founder
 George Cory (historian) (1862–1935), South African chemist and historian
 George Norton Cory (1874–1968), Canadian Lieutenant-General
 J. Campbell Cory (1867–1925), American cartoonist
 John Cory (1828–1910), British philanthropist, coal-owner, and ship-owner
 Judith A. Cory, Oscar-nominated makeup artist
 Kate Cory (1861–1958), American photographer and painter of Hopi
 Peter Cory (1925–2020), judge on the Supreme Court of Canada
 Robert Cory, English churchman and professor of moral philosophy
 William Johnson Cory (1823–1892), English educator and poet
 William Wallace Cory (1865–1943), Canadian politician

Nickname 
Corazon Aquino (1933–2009), Filipino politician and former president of the Philippines

Fictional characters
Cory Baxter, from the TV series That's So Raven and Cory in the House
Cory Dollanganger, from the 1979 novel Flowers in the Attic by V. C. Andrews
Cory Ellison, from the TV series The Morning Show
Cory Matthews, from the TV series Boy Meets World and Girl Meets World
Cory Maxson, from the play Fences, by August Wilson
"Richard Cory", the subject of an 1897 poem by Edwin Arlington Robinson
The Cory family, from the soap opera Another World

See also
Corey
Corie, given name
Corrie (given name)
Corrie (surname)
Kory (given name)
Kory (disambiguation), includes a list of people with the surname Kory

References 

English-language unisex given names